Lee Rose is an American director, producer and writer of film and television.

Rose began her professional career in 1993 producing and writing the television film It's Nothing Personal. Throughout the 1990s, she also worked on the films Deconstructing Sarah, A Mother's Prayer, An Unexpected Family, and An Unexpected Life. She made her directorial debut with the 1998 film, The Color of Courage, starring Linda Hamilton and Lynn Whitfield.

Her TV film credits continued into the 2000s, including The Truth About Jane, A Girl Thing, What Girls Learn, An Unexpected Love, Jack, and A Taste of Romance.

In 2004, Rose began directing episodic television. Her credits include Soul Food, Weeds, Related, Cashmere Mafia, Lincoln Heights, Lost Girl, Greek, XIII: The Series, The Glades, In Plain Sight, Haven, Under the Dome, and True Blood. Current TV series that she is involved with include Grace and Frankie, Code Black, Star Trek: Discovery, and Firefly Lane.

Rose is taking on the role of executive producer for an upcoming series titled True North for which she also wrote the script.

See also
 List of female film and television directors
 List of lesbian filmmakers
 List of LGBT-related films directed by women

References

External links

American LGBT screenwriters
American women film directors
American women film producers
American women television producers
American women screenwriters
American women television directors
American women television writers
American lesbian writers
Lesbian screenwriters
Living people
Place of birth missing (living people)
Year of birth missing (living people)
21st-century American women writers